Oriola may stand for:

 Oriola (grape), another name for the French wine grape Uva Rara
 Orihuela or Oriola, a city in the province of Alicante, Spain
 Oriola (Portugal), a parish in the municipality of Portel, Portugal
 701 Oriola, an asteroid discovered by Joseph Helffrich
 Bukola Oriola (born 1976), Nigerian American journalist
 Christian D'Oriola (1928–2007), French foil fencer